The 1939/1940 Daily Mail Gold Cup was a professional snooker tournament sponsored by the Daily Mail. The cup was won by Alec Brown with Sydney Lee finishing in second place in the final table. It was the sixth and last Daily Mail Gold Cup tournament, although only the fourth as a snooker event. The Daily Mail Gold Cup ran from 1935 to 1940.

Format
The 1939/1940 event was a round-robin snooker tournament and was played from 16 October 1939 to 10 February 1940. Most of the matches were played at Thurston's Hall in London. There were 7 competitors and a total of 21 matches. Each match lasted six days and was the best of 61 frames, a reduction from the 71 frames played in previous years. The 7 included three competitors new to the event: Fred Davis, Walter Donaldson and Sydney Lee. The handicap system was the same as the previous year, each match having a separate handicap.

Joe Davis gave Sidney Smith 20, Alec Brown 25, Walter Donaldson 25, Fred Davis 30, Tom Newman 40 and Sydney Lee 45. Sidney Smith played level with Alec Brown and gave Walter Donaldson 10, Fred Davis 15, Tom Newman 20 and Sydney Lee 30. Alec Brown played level with Walter Donaldson and gave Fred Davis 10, Tom Newman 10 and Sydney Lee 25. Walter Donaldson played level with Fred Davis 15 and gave Tom Newman 10 and Sydney Lee 20. Fred Davis gave Tom Newman 10 and Sydney Lee 25. Tom Newman gave Sydney Lee 15.

Results
Joe Davis struggled with the harsh handicaps given against him and lost his first three matches. He then had a remarkable win against Sydney Lee. Conceding 45 points in every frame, Davis was 16–14 behind after three days play. He then won 16 of the 20 frames on the next two days to lead 30–20 and eventually won 35–26. Joe lost to brother Fred but won his last match against Sidney Smith. With a 20-point advantage, Smith led 29–26 but Davis won the first 5 frames of the final evening session to win the match and avoid the "wooden spoon".

Table

The positions were determined firstly by the number of matches won (MW) and, in the event of a tie, the number of frames won (FW).

References

1939-1940
1939 in snooker
1940 in snooker
1939 in English sport
1940 in English sport
1939 sports events in London
1940 sports events in London
October 1939 sports events
November 1939 sports events
December 1939 sports events
January 1940 sports events